Ā, lowercase ā, is a grapheme, a Latin A with a macron, used in several orthographies. Ā is used to denote a long A. Examples are the Baltic languages (e.g. Latvian), Polynesian languages, some romanizations of Japanese, Persian, Pashto, Assyrian Neo-Aramaic (which represents a long A sound) and Arabic, and some Latin texts (especially for learners). In Romanised Mandarin Chinese (pinyin) it is used to represent A spoken with a level high tone (first tone). It is used in some orthography-based transcriptions of English to represent the diphthong  (see ).

In the International Alphabet of Sanskrit Transliteration, Ā represents the open back unrounded vowel "आ", not to be confused with the similar Devanagari character for the mid central vowel, अ.

In languages other than Sanskrit, Ā is sorted with other A's and is not considered a separate letter. The macron is only considered when sorting words that are otherwise identical. For example, in Māori, tāu (meaning your) comes after tau (meaning year), but before taumata (hill).

Computer encoding

References 

Latin letters with diacritics
Phonetic transcription symbols